Oronym may refer to:

 Oronym (toponymy), a type of toponym, designating a proper name of a mountain or hill
 Same-sounding phrases, phrases that are pronounced similarly due to various homophonic effects

See also
 Choronym